Belenli is a village in the District of Kaş, Antalya Province, Turkey. Nearby is the site of the ancient city of Isinda.

History
There is no information about the history of this village. Belenli village is famous for the original springs. The official village settlement is 70 km away from the springs. Each location has a headman. There are two villages, that are autonomous in administration.

References

Villages in Kaş District